Limoges – Bellegarde Airport is an airport located  west-northwest of Limoges, a commune of the Haute-Vienne department in the Nouvelle-Aquitaine region of France. The airport presently has limited mass transit options which include only three stops per day of bus line 26 and a shared taxi service to and from the main train station.

Facilities
It has one paved runway designated 03/21 which measures .

Airlines and destinations
The following airlines operate regular scheduled and charter flights at Limoges – Bellegarde Airport:

Statistics

References

External links 

 Limoges Airport (official site) 
 Aéroport de Limoges (Union des Aéroports Français) 
 
 
 

Airports in Nouvelle-Aquitaine
Buildings and structures in Haute-Vienne
Airports established in 1972